The 1991–92 Wake Forest Demon Deacons men's basketball team represented Wake Forest University as a member of the Atlantic Coast Conference during the 1991–92 NCAA men's basketball season.

Roster

Schedule and results

|-
!colspan=9 style=| Regular Season

|-
!colspan=9 style=| ACC Tournament

|-
!colspan=9 style=| NCAA Tournament

Rankings

Team players in the 1992 NBA draft

References

Wake Forest Demon Deacons men's basketball seasons
Wake Forest
Wake Forest
Wake Forest Demon Deacons Men's Basketball
Wake Forest Demon Deacons Men's Basketball